The Didinga language (’Di’dinga) is an Eastern Sudanic language spoken by the Chukudum and Lowudo peoples of the Didinga Hills of South Sudan. It is classified as a member of the southwest branch Surmic languages (Fleming 1983). Its nearest relative is Laaarim.

The New Testament in the Didinga language was dedicated in March 2018.

References

Relevant literature
 De Jong, N., 2001. The ideophone in Didinga. Typological studies in language 44, pp.121-138.
 Fleming, Harold. 1983. "Surmic etymologies," in Nilotic Studies: Proceedings of the International Symposium on Languages and History of the Nilotic Peoples, Rainer Vossen and Marianne Bechhaus-Gerst, 524–555. Berlin: Dietrich Reimer.
 Odden, David. 1983. Aspects of Didinga phonology and morphology. Nilo-Saharan language studies, pp.148-176.

External links
Didinga basic lexicon at the Global Lexicostatistical Database

Languages of South Sudan
Surmic languages
Verb–subject–object languages